Persicula imbricata is a species of sea snail, a marine gastropod mollusk, in the family Cystiscidae.

References

imbricata
Gastropods described in 1844
Cystiscidae